Grostenquin is a commune in the Moselle department in Grand Est in north-eastern France, situated between Metz and Strasbourg.

Localities of the commune: Béning, Bertring, Hingsange, Linstroff.

History 
Its population in 1999 was 569 people.

A Royal Canadian Air Force (RCAF) base, RCAF Station Grostenquin, was located here from 1952–1964. After the departure of the RCAF, the airport was closed by the French. The facilities are still used by the French Armed Forces for military exercises.

Notable people 
 NHL player and coach Paul MacLean and Avril Lavigne's father were born here.
 Theodore B. Basselin (1851–1914), lumber magnate, was born here.

See also 
 Communes of the Moselle department

References

External links 
 

Communes of Moselle (department)